James Franklin "Frank" Sawyer (May 1, 1899 – 1979) was an American Depression-era bank robber and prison escapee. An associate of Jim Clark, Ed Davis and other fellow Oklahoma bandits, he was a participant in countless bank robberies throughout Kansas and Oklahoma between 1917 and 1933. He was wrongfully imprisoned for a 1932 bank robbery in Fort Scott, Kansas and spent almost 40 years in prison before he was pardoned by Governor Robert Docking in 1969.

Early life and criminal career
James Sawyer was born near Durant, Oklahoma on May 1, 1899. Raised in a strict Baptist family, he was the fourth of nine children. However, he started getting into trouble as a teenager and, at age 17, started robbing banks with Jim Baldwin and Tom Slaughter. Sawyer was eventually thrown out and disowned by his parents after discovering stolen money from a then recent bank job.

He eventually found work in the gambling halls of Wichita, Kansas. It was there that he met professional bank robbers Jeff Davis, Bud Maxwell and Henry Wells with whom he would take part in a string of bank robberies during 1917 and early-1918. Sawyer was then drafted into the U.S. Army but was discharged shortly after the Armistice and returned to Wichita where he became a professional gambler. He may have been connected to Al Spencer's gang, which robbed a large number of trains and banks during the early 1920s, but there is no conclusive evidence to support this claim.

Sawyer was, however, responsible for killing two men in disputes over card games. The first was bank robber John Moore who he shot and killed after Moore accused of him of cheating. Afterwards, Sawyer briefly returned to his hometown where he shot a local card dealer named Bleaker whom he accused of cheating. Sawyer was arrested for the shooting in Dallas six months later and extradited back to Oklahoma where was convicted of murder and sentenced to life imprisonment. Arriving at the state penitentiary in McAlester on April 13, 1920, he was in prison for two years before escaping. It is unknown whether he was a member of the team that robbed a U.S. mail train of $20,000 on August 20, 1923, one which included Al Spencer, Frank Nash and several others, but several reports claim he was in the area where police and federal agents shot and killed Al Spencer near Bartlesville, Oklahoma a month later.

Escape from McAlester and the Fort Scott robbery
Sawyer was married that same year and although his wife tried to persuade him otherwise, he continued his criminal actives. He was arrested the following year shortly after his daughter was born and returned to McAlester to finish his sentence. On February 2, 1930, Sawyer was assigned to a prison work party assigned to paint the state capitol building in Oklahoma City and escaped after eluding careless guards. He remained around the capitol for another two years supporting himself by gambling and robberies. He was identified as one of the men who robbed a small bank in Union, Missouri on May 2, 1932.

It was shortly after this heist that he teamed with Jim Clark and Ed Davis for a planned robbery in Rich Hill, Missouri but called it off, supposedly due to a case of bad nerves, quietly leaving the bank before drawing their pistols. They were arrested by police several hours later, caught in the dragnet searching for the men who robbed a bank in Fort Scott, Kansas that afternoon, and were taken in for questioning. One of those who accompanied the arresting officers, 17-year-old Stanley Butner, described the arrest.

Although no evidence connected them to the robbery, they were all escaped convicts who were driving a stolen car. All three were indicted and wrongly convicted of the Fort Scott bank heist, in actuality committed by the Barker Gang, and sent to the state prison in Lansing. At least one account claims Sawyer was one of four outlaws recruited to rob the bank, referred to as a member of the "St. Paul Outfit", which included Harvey Bailey, Jim Clark and Ed Davis.

Escape from Lansing
Sawyer and his partners escaped from Lansing less than a year later, joining a mass escape with eight other inmates on May 30, 1933. He and the others forced their way out using pistols, smuggled in by Frank Nash, and among whom included Harvey Bailey, Robert "Big Bob" Brady and Wilbur Underhill. Sawyer went off on his own after the group reached the Cookson Hills on June 4. A series of mishaps followed as Sawyer attempted to flee the area. He first attempted to hitchhike but eventually resorted to stealing a car at gunpoint. The motor of this first car died soon after and his second car blew a tire near Middleburg. He was forced to abandon yet another car when it began developing problems with the steering rod. He managed to steal a fourth car from a farm and drove it a little over six miles before it broke down just north of Gracemont. He hijacked another car but the driver purposely steered the car into a roadside ditch. Sawyer was eventually confronted near Chickasaw by Sheriff Horace Crisp and a deputy, then investigating the string of car thefts in the area, who was disarmed then knocked unconsciousness.

Prison years and pardon
Returned to McAlester to serve his sentence, he was transferred to the state reformatory in 1946 and the paroled to Kansas where he was then returned to Lansing and remained there for over two decades. Sawyer was finally pardoned by Governor Robert Docking on September 18, 1969, after a signed affidavit by Alvin Karpis cleared Sawyer of the 1933 Fort Scott robbery. Sawyer filed a lawsuit against the state for wrongful imprisonment, but the case went on for several years, up until his death.

References

Further reading
"Warden, Three Women Two Guards Kidnapped By Fleeing Convicts; Eleven Escape From Lansing, Kans., Prison During Ball Game--Elude Police Cars Captive Officials Later Are Freed Car With Invalid Woman and Two Girls Seized-- One Group Fleeing Through Oklahoma". Hartford Courant. 31 May 1933.
"Prison Fled By Eleven; Warden, Seized, Freed Later". Los Angeles Times. 31 May 1933.
"Kidnapped Warden Freed By Felons; No Word From Women Second Group Seized; Kansas Prison Chief Left in Oklahoma. Meyer Wins Indianapolis Auto Race; Three Killed--Kansas Convicts Escape; Release Warden After Wild Ride". Chicago Daily Tribune. 31 May 1933.
"Oklahomans Trap Kansas Convict; Frank Sawyer, Who Kidnapped 8 Persons in Their Autos, Is Taken at Binger. Two Others Are Trailed; They Hold Up Filling Station at Mammoth Springs, Ark., and Drive Into Missouri". The New York Times. 5 Jun 1933.
"Convict Bands Spread Terror. Oklahoma Officers Capture One of Kansas Fugitives". Los Angeles Times. 5 Jun 1933.
"The chase may be over, but its chilling memories last a lifetime". Kansas City Star. 10 Oct 1993.
"Frank Sawyer, 70, paroled after found innocent of 1932 Kansas bank robbery. Served 37 years Alvin Karpis recently admitted it". CBS Evening News. Columbia Broadcasting Service. 17 Sep 1969.

1899 births
1979 deaths
American bank robbers
American escapees
American people convicted of murder
American prisoners sentenced to life imprisonment
Depression-era gangsters
Escapees from Oklahoma detention
Fugitives
People convicted of murder by Oklahoma
People from Durant, Oklahoma
Prisoners sentenced to life imprisonment by Oklahoma
Recipients of American gubernatorial pardons